Aldo Tomasini (born 15 September 1952) is a former Italian male long-distance runner who competed at three editions of the IAAF World Cross Country Championships (from 1973 to 1975), and won three national championships at senior level (two outdoor and one indoor.

References

External links
 

1952 births
Living people
Italian male long-distance runners